Jason Paul Cayless (born 15 January 1980) is a former New Zealand international rugby league footballer who played as a prop in the 2000s and 2010s. He played for the Parramatta Eels, Sydney Roosters and the Wests Tigers in the NRL and St Helens in the Super League.

He won the 2002 Telstra Premiership and the 2003 World Club Challenge with the Roosters, and the 2006 Challenge Cup, 2006 Super League Grand Final, 2007 Challenge Cup and the 2007 World Club Challenge with the Saints.

Background
Cayless was born in Sydney, New South Wales, Australia. He is of Maori descent. He is the younger brother of Nathan Cayless.

Club career

Parramatta Eels
Cayless started his career in the National Rugby League with the Parramatta Eels alongside his older brother, Nathan Cayless, who had already been with the club for three years. 

In 2001 he made his representative début for New South Wales Country Origin.

Sydney Roosters
The following year Cayless moved to the Sydney Roosters and played for them at prop forward in their 2002 NRL Grand Final win over the New Zealand Warriors. 

Having won the 2002 NRL Premiership, the Roosters traveled to England to play the 2003 World Club Challenge against Super League champions, St Helens. Cayless played at prop forward in Sydney's victory.  

He played at prop for the Sydney Roosters in the 2003 NRL grand final which was lost to the Penrith Panthers.

Cayless played for the Roosters at prop forward in their 2004 NRL grand final loss to cross-Sydney rivals, the Bulldogs.

St Helens
Cayless played for St Helens as a prop forward in their 2006 Challenge Cup Final victory against the Huddersfield Giants. 

St Helens reached the 2006 Super League Grand final to be contested against Hull F.C. and Cayless played as a prop forward in Saints' 26–4 victory.

As 2006 Super League champions, St Helens faced 2006 NRL Premiers the Brisbane Broncos in the 2007 World Club Challenge. Cayless played at prop forward in the Saints' 18–14 victory.

Wests Tigers
After spending four seasons in the Super League, in October 2009 Cayless signed with the Wests Tigers on a two-year contract starting in 2010. He started the first three games of the season from the bench, but injuries saw him make no further appearances for the Tigers in 2010. He announced his retirement before the start of the 2011 season.

International career
He made his international début for New Zealand in 2002 and went on to play in ten Test matches for New Zealand.

Highlights
First Grade Debut: Round 21, Parramatta v Wests Tigers at Parramatta Stadium, 25 June 2000
National Representation: 11 Tests for New Zealand
NRL Premiership Winner: 2002 for Sydney Roosters
Super League Championship Winner: 2006 for St Helens
Carnegie Challenge Cup Winner: 2006 for St Helens
World Club Challenge Winner: 2007 for St Helens

References

External links

Wests Tigers profile
Jason Cayless St Helens profile
Saints Heritage Society profile

1980 births
Living people
Australian people of Māori descent
Australian rugby league players
New South Wales City Origin rugby league team players
New Zealand Māori rugby league players
New Zealand national rugby league team players
Parramatta Eels players
Rugby league players from Sydney
Rugby league props
St Helens R.F.C. players
Sydney Roosters players
Wests Tigers players